The Proceedings of the International Association for Business and Society is an
annual series that publishes a selection of the peer-reviewed papers presented at the association's annual conference.

About
Each volume contains papers in the following areas:

 Business Ethics
 Corporate Social Responsibility and Social Performance
 Environmental Management and Regulation
 Corporate Governance Issues
 Stakeholder Issues and Theory
 Public Affairs and Public Policy
 Teaching and Research Issues

The International Association for Business and Society is a learned society that supports research and teaching about the relationships between business, government, and society. It has published these Proceedings for its members since 1990, first in print format and then on CD-ROM. The series is now only published in electronic format and volumes 16 (2005) to the present are available online from the Philosophy Documentation Center. Contributors include Donna Wood, Duane Windsor, James Weber, Steven Wartick, Mark Starik, Sanjay Sharma, Kathleen Rehbein, Gordon Rands, Robert Phillips, John Mahon, Jeanne Logsdon, Anne Lawrence, Bryan Husted, and Virginia Gerde.

External links 
 
 International Association for Business and Society
 Philosophy Documentation Center

References

Business and management journals
Business ethics
English-language journals
Publications established in 1990
Philosophy Documentation Center academic journals